Eddie Mottau (born December 10, 1943) is an American guitarist. His career has included membership in the duo Two Guys from Boston, The Bait Shop, Bo Grumpus, Jolliver Arkansaw, and Noel Paul Stookey of Peter, Paul and Mary. He was a sought after session musician in New York and LA. session work for Jackie DeShannon, Stookey, John Lennon, Yoko Ono, and David Peel, Felix Pappalardi and Creation.

Career 
Mottau was part of the folk duo Two Guys from Boston, with Joe Hutchinson and recorded "Come on Betty Home" and "Shimmy Like My Sister Kate" for Scepter Records released in 1964. The duo moved to Greenwich Village shortly after the release of the single and were regular performers at The Gaslight Cafe, The Bitter End, Gertie's Folk City, and the Cafe Wha. The Duo then formed a band called Bo Grumpus  which included drummer Norman Smart and Jim Colgrove on Bass Guitar. Bo Grumpus recorded an album titled Before the War, which was produced by Felix Pappalardi for Atlantic Records. The band then became Joliver Arkansaw and released an album titled Home released in 1969 for Bell Records which was also produced by Pappalardi.

In 1971, Mottau was invited to join bassist/producer Jim Mason to play guitar and co-produce the first solo album of Noel Paul Stookey.

Mottau's first solo album, No Turning Around, was released in 1973 on MCA Records. The album was produced by Stookey, and featured jazz great Jerry Mulligan.  No Turning Around was re released by MCA Records in Japan in 2001.

Mottau also played guitar on Lennon's albums Walls and Bridges, Some Time in New York City, and Rock 'n' Roll.
Mottau went on tour with Lennon and Yoko Ono appearing at the Attica State concert at the Apollo Theater in New York City and the John Sinclair Freedom Rally in Ann Arbor, Michigan in 1971. 

Mottau's next solo album, No Moulding, was released in 1977 by Neworld. No Moulding was re-released in digitized format in the fall of 2020.

In 2004 he recorded a record as a member of the trio Mottau, Drew & Clark, with bass player, singer songwriter Jimmy Clark, and drummer and percussionist Bob Drew, producing the album Dance for Love.

On October 1, 2020, Mottau, Drew & Clark released a new Album titled Revelation/Revolution.

Personal life 
Eddie Mottau was married to Kathy Mottau in 1963. They had two children, Christine Mottau and Ed Mottau Jr. They moved to New Hampshire in the 1970s from NYC.
Kathy died on December 14, 2018 at the age of 75. Kathy had been the director of Kids Together, an after-school program based in Peterborough, NH up until June 2017.

Mottau continues to live in Peterborough.

References

American session musicians
American rock guitarists
American male guitarists
Musicians from Boston
Living people
Plastic Ono Band members
Guitarists from Massachusetts
Year of birth missing (living people)